Dynamos Football Club may refer to:
Dynamos F.C. (South Africa), a South African football club
Dynamos F.C., a Zimbabwean football club
Dynamos FC (Bahamas), a Bahamanian football club